No. 582 Squadron RAF was a bomber pathfinder squadron of the Royal Air Force during the Second World War.

History
The squadron was formed with Avro Lancasters on 1 April 1944 at RAF Little Staughton, Huntingdonshire, England, from 'C' Flight of 7 Squadron and 'C' Flight 156 Squadron. It was part of No. 8 Group RAF, also referred to as the Pathfinder Force, and began operation nine days later with a night raid on Lille on the 9/10 April 1944.
The squadron's last operational raid against enemy forces was a raid on gun batteries on the island of Wangerooge on 25 April 1945. The squadron spent the remainder of the war dropping food to the Dutch, during Operation Manna, and repatriating prisoners of war in Operation Exodus. It was disbanded at RAF Little Staughton on 10 September 1945.

The squadron had operated 2,157 sorties and lost 28 aircraft during the war.

Victoria Cross
During a raid on 23 February 1945, Captain Edwin Swales, a South African, won a posthumous Victoria Cross over Pforzheim. In addition, a further posthumous VC was awarded to a pilot of a 582 Squadron aircraft. Sqn Ldr Robert "Bob" Palmer, a Mosquito pilot of 109 Squadron led a daylight attack on 23 December 1944, using OBOE, on the Gremberg marshalling yards in Cologne with his regular navigator Flt Lt George Russell. They were flying on the Lancaster (PB371) of Flt Lt Owen Milne alongside other 582 Squadron aircrew. Of those on board the aircraft, only the rear gunner survived the attack.

Aircraft operated

Squadron bases

See also
List of Royal Air Force aircraft squadrons

References

Notes

Bibliography

Further reading

Feast, Sean  Heroic Endeavour: The Remarkable Story of One Pathfinder Force Attack, a Victoria Cross and 206 Brave Men. London: Grub Street, 2006. .
Feast, Sean  Master Bombers: The Experiences of a Pathfinder Squadron at War, 1942-1945. London: Grub Street, 2008. .
Feast, Sean  The Pathfinder Companion. London: Grub Street, 2012. .
Stocker, Flt Lt Ted, DSO, DFC A Pathfinders war: An extraordinary tale of surviving over 100 bomber operations against all odds. London: Grub Street, 2009. .

External links

 582 Squadron on RAF website
 Bases of No. 582 Squadron
 History of No.'s 541–598 Squadrons at RAF Web

Bomber squadrons of the Royal Air Force in World War II
Military units and formations established in 1944
Military units and formations disestablished in 1945
582